Valter Lundgren (10 September 1917 – 21 November 1997) was a Swedish footballer. He played in seven matches for the Sweden national football team in 1937 and 1938. He was also named in Sweden's squad for the Group 1 qualification tournament for the 1938 FIFA World Cup.

References

External links
 

1917 births
1997 deaths
Swedish footballers
Sweden international footballers
Association football defenders
People from Nynäshamn Municipality
Sportspeople from Stockholm County